List of Bien de Interés Cultural landmarks in the Province of Zaragoza, located in the Aragon region of northeastern Spain.

Listed landmarks
 Aljafería
 Aragonese Way
 Augusta Bilbilis
 Basilica of Our Lady of the Pillar
 Calatayud
 Charterhouse of Aula Dei
 Church of San Pedro de los Francos
 Church of Santa Engracia de Zaragoza
 Colegiata de Santa María la Mayor (Caspe)
 Collegiate church of Santa María (Calatayud)
 Church of Santa María (Ateca)
 Condes de Argillo Palace
 Iglesia de Santa Tecla
 La Seo Cathedral
 Mausoleum of the Atilii
 Monasterio de Piedra
 Monastery of Comendadoras Canonesas del Santo Sepulcro
 Puerta del Carmen
 Roman mausoleum of Fabara
 Rueda Abbey
 Sádaba Castle
 San Gil Abad (Zaragoza)
 San Miguel de los Navarros
 Santa Fe Abbey
 Santa María Magdalena, Zaragoza
 San Pablo church
 Archaeological zone of Segeda
 Tarazona Cathedral
 Veruela Abbey

See also

References 

 
Zaragoza
Aragonese culture
Buildings and structures in Zaragoza
Bien de Interés Cultural landmarks in Aragon